Okechukwu Christian Irobiso (born 28 May 1993) is a Nigerian professional footballer who plays as a forward for Liga I club Petrolul Ploiești.

Career
On 11 February 2014, he signed a contract with the Slovak side Senica.

References

External links
 
 
 UEFA Profile

1993 births
Living people
Sportspeople from Lagos
Nigerian footballers
Nigerian expatriate footballers
Association football forwards
F.C. Paços de Ferreira players
C.F. União players
S.C. Farense players
C.D. Cova da Piedade players
Varzim S.C. players
FK Senica players
Slovak Super Liga players
FC Vysočina Jihlava players
Czech First League players
Primeira Liga players
Liga Portugal 2 players
Liga I players
CS Gaz Metan Mediaș players
FC Dinamo București players
FC Petrolul Ploiești players
Expatriate footballers in Portugal
Expatriate footballers in Slovakia
Expatriate footballers in the Czech Republic
Expatriate footballers in Romania
Nigerian expatriate sportspeople in the Czech Republic
Nigerian expatriate sportspeople in Slovakia
Nigerian expatriate sportspeople in Portugal
Nigerian expatriate sportspeople in Romania